Pollokshields West railway station is one of three railway stations in Pollokshields, a district of Glasgow, Scotland. The station is managed by ScotRail and lies on the Cathcart Circle Line.  The Cathcart Circle Line has been electrified since 1962 under British Railways.

Services

Up to November 1979 
Two trains per hour between Glasgow Central and Kirkhill and one train per hour in each direction on the Cathcart Circle (Inner and Outer).

From November 1979 
Following the opening of the Argyle Line on 5 November 1979, two trains per hour between Glasgow Central and Kirkhill and two trains per hour in each direction on the Cathcart Circle (Inner and Outer).

From 2006 
One train per hour between Glasgow Central and Kirkhill/ and one train per hour in each direction on the Cathcart Circle (Inner and Outer). The Cathcart Circle trains do not run on Sundays, so only an hourly service operates.

Routes

See also
 Pollokshields railway station
 Pollokshields East railway station

References

Sources 

 
 
 
 

Railway stations in Glasgow
Former Caledonian Railway stations
Railway stations in Great Britain opened in 1894
SPT railway stations
Railway stations served by ScotRail
Pollokshields